is a Japanese actor and voice actor.

Roles

Television drama
Ai no Inoie ~ Nakimushi Sato to Shichinin to Ko
Bengoshi Sako Mariko no Yuigon Sakusei File
Matamo ya Metaka Teishu-dono ~Bakumatsu no Meibugyū: Ogurikōzukenosuke~
Oyajii.
Sawayaka 3 Kumi

Television animation
Umigame to Shōnen (Kenta)

Theatrical animation
Kappa no Coo to Natsuyasumi (Kōichi's Classmate)
Momoko, Kaeru no Uta Gakikoeru yo (Kenta Yoshida)

Video games
Drag-On Dragoon (Seere)
Drag-On Dragoon 2: Fūin no Aka, Haitoku no Kuro (Seere)

Dubbing roles

Live action
A.I. Artificial Intelligence (Martin Swinton (Jake Thomas))
Batman Begins (Young Bruce Wayne)
The Blue Butterfly (Pete Carlton)
The Book of Pooh (Christopher Robin)
Les Choristes (Young Pierre Morhange (Jean-Baptiste Maunier))
The Devil's Backbone (Carlos)
E.T. the Extra-Terrestrial (20th Anniversary edition) (Elliot (Henry Thomas))
Friend (Jeong-ho)
Goal! (Additional voices)
The Haunting (Additional voices)
Jumong (Onjo of Baekje)
Millions (Anthony Cunningham)
Kung Fu Hustle (Additional voices)
Peter Pan (John Darling)
Shanghai Knights (Charlie Chaplin)
Signs (Morgan Hess)

Animation
The Jungle Book 2 (Mowgli)
The Lion King 1½ (Young Simba)
Piglet's Big Movie (Christopher Robin)
Return to Never Land (Nibs)
Robots (Additional voices)

Commercials
Digital Monsters Card Game

Stage
Sans Famille

References

External links
Profile

1991 births
Japanese male voice actors
Japanese male child actors
Japanese male television actors
Living people